

The North Col refers to the sharp-edged pass carved by glaciers in the ridge connecting Mount Everest and Changtse in Tibet. It forms the head of the East Rongbuk Glacier.

Climbers make their final push to the summit from Camp VI at 8,230 metres (27,001 ft) altitude.

The North Col was first climbed by George Mallory, Edward Oliver Wheeler, and Guy Bullock on 24 September 1921, during the British reconnaissance expedition. This was the first time a Westerner had set foot on Mount Everest. Although long credited to Mallory, discovery of the North Col was in fact made by Wheeler about a week before Mallory confirmed its existence while searching for possible routes to the summit of Mount Everest. All subsequent expeditions in the 1920s and 1930s attempted to reach the summit of Everest by using the North Col.

Before 1950, most Everest expeditions went from Tibet and via the North Col, but most now go from Nepal via the South Col. In 1951, two mountaineers on the 1952 British Cho Oyu expedition, Edmund Hillary and George Lowe, crossed the Nup La Col, and "like a couple of naughty schoolboys" went deep into Chinese territory, down to Rongbuk and round to the old prewar Camp III beneath the North Col.

Overview
This map is inverted; south is up and north is down.  The North Col is lower than South Col, and farther from the Everest peak.

See also
South Col
Sagarmatha National Park
Geology of the Himalaya
Geography of China

References

External links

 Painting of the Camp on North-Col
 Description of the climbing route to the summit via the North Col

Mount Everest
Mountain passes of the Himalayas
Mountain passes of Tibet
Mountain passes of China